Kurtha Assembly constituency is an assembly constituency in Arwal district of Bihar. It is the part of Jahanabad (Lok Sabha constituency). In Kurtha constituency, Kushwaha, Yadav and Bhumihar voters are descisive in ensuring victory of a candidate, due to their numerical preponderance. In 1969, the Shoshit Samaj Party leader, Jagdev Prasad, who was also called 'Lenin of Bihar', won from this assembly constituency. Satyadev Kushwaha won twice in 2010 and 2015 from here. In 2020, however, he was defeated by Bagi Kumar Verma of Rashtriya Janata Dal.

Members of Legislative Assembly

Election Results

2020

References

External links
 

Assembly constituencies of Bihar